Mohsen Ghahremani (born 30 June 1974 in Mashhad) is a retired Iranian football referee.

Professional career 
Mohsen Ghahremani started his career in 1989 when he was only 15 years old. He became a national referee in 1999 and entered the international list in 2003. Until 2013, he was one of the official referees of FIFA. In the same year, he became the fourth referee to officiate the Jordan-Palestine match of the Athens 2004 Olympic qualifiers. He then went to Turkmenistan and refereed the Kyrgyz-Turkmenistan match at the Asian Youth Tournament, and in 2005 became the referee of the Asian Elite. In the same year, in the 2005 AFC Champions League, he officiated Al-Wahda SC of Syria and Al-Zawraa SC of Iraq, and in the quarter-finals he officiated Al-Ittihad of Saudi Arabia and Shandong Luneng of China.

He also refereed the 2005 East Asian Football Championship final between South Korea and North Korea. He refereed in different Iranian leagues for 25 years.

External links

References

Iranian football referees
Living people
People from Mashhad
1974 births